The 1880 United States presidential election in Oregon took place on November 2, 1880, as part of the 1880 United States presidential election. Voters chose three representatives, or electors to the Electoral College, who voted for president and vice president.

Oregon voted for the Republican nominee, James A. Garfield, over the Democratic nominee, Winfield Scott Hancock. Garfield won the state by a narrow margin of 1.63%.

Results

Results by county

See also
 United States presidential elections in Oregon

Notes

References

Oregon
1880
1880 Oregon elections